Carlos Calvo may refer to:

 Carlos Calvo (historian) (1824–1906), Argentine publicist and historian
 Carlos Calvo (footballer, born 1985), Spanish footballer
 Carlos Calvo (footballer, born 1992), Mexican footballer
 Carlos Calvo (gymnast) (born 1994), Colombian artistic gymnast
 Carlos Avendaño Calvo (born 1955), Costa Rican politician
 Carlos Calvo Calbimontes, Bolivian politician; President of the Chamber of Deputies of Bolivia 1919–1920
  (1953–2020), Argentine actor and comedian; star of the 1997–1998 telenovela R.R.D.T.